Albula (German) is a river of Switzerland, a right tributary of the Hinterrhein. Length: , Basin: . It flows into the Hinterrhein near Thusis.

Rivers of Switzerland
Rivers of Graubünden
 
Albula/Alvra
Bergün Filisur
Fürstenau, Switzerland
Sils im Domleschg
Scharans
Thusis
Vaz/Obervaz